Wada'a Hashid is a sub-district located in Bani Suraim District, 'Amran Governorate, Yemen. Wada'a Hashid had a population of 7833 according to the 2004 census.

References 

Sub-districts in Bani Suraim District